Mesonauta acora is a species of cichlid fish native to blackwater in the Xingu and Tocantins River basins in South America. The species was named by François Louis de la Porte, comte de Castelnau in 1855.

All Mesonauta Acoras are omnivores. Their diet is composed of insects, aquatic invertebrates and algae.

See also
List of freshwater aquarium fish species

References 

acora
Fish of South America
Taxa named by François-Louis Laporte, comte de Castelnau
Fish described in 1855